Giles Gordon Kirlue Barnes (born 5 August 1988) is a former professional footballer who played as a forward. He is assistant head coach of Orlando Pride of the National Women's Soccer League.

He began his career with Derby County, where he won the club's Young Player of the Year award in 2007 and was Championship Player of the Month in March 2007. Barnes represented England at under-19 level. He however opted to represent Jamaica at senior level, making his Reggae Boyz debut in March 2015 and representing them at the Copa América and CONCACAF Gold Cup later that year, helping them to the final of the latter event.

Club career

Derby County

Barnes was born in Barking, London. His professional career began on his 17th birthday when he signed a professional contract with Derby County after being a trainee. He made his first-team debut under Phil Brown aged 17 as an 84th-minute substitute for Paul Peschisolido in a 1–0 defeat at home to Grimsby Town in the 2005–06 League Cup, with his league debut coming in a 1–1 draw away to Crewe two weeks later as a 73rd minute replacement for Marcus Tudgay. Barnes intermittently made first-team appearances as Derby struggled but began to command a regular place when Phil Brown was replaced by Derby's academy manager Terry Westley in January 2006. Westley was familiar with Barnes from his time as a youngster at Derby and made him an integral part of the team as Derby managed to avoid relegation to League One. Barnes played a role in 16 matches under Westley, with his first start coming in Westley's first match in charge (a narrow 1–0 home defeat to Sheffield United) and his first professional goal coming in a 2–2 draw away to Watford.

His performances during the end of the 2005–06 season drew interest from the Premier League during the close season, but with the appointment of Billy Davies as manager and new investment, Barnes signed a four-year extension to his current contract. Barnes became a regular in the Derby team that won promotion to the Premier League, playing in 46 matches (with 34 of those starts) putting him behind only the club's player of the year Steve Howard in terms of appearances. He also scored eight goals, including four in two weeks with a 92nd-minute equaliser in a 2–2 draw away to Cardiff City, a brace in a 2–1 home win over Barnsley, and the winner in a 2–1 home win against West Bromwich Albion. During this time he gained a reputation for supposedly saying "Whoosh" as he ran past defenders. In a 2017 interview, he indicated this was a one-time response to aggression from an opponent, and has been taken out of context. His performances in March 2007 earned him the Championship Player of the Month award for that month. Although he picked up an injury towards the end of the season, Barnes was still able to make an impact in Derby's successful Championship play-off campaign in his two substitute appearances. It was his corner from which Leon Best scored an own goal in the second leg of the semi-final clash with Southampton and he also came off the bench to set up Stephen Pearson's winner in the 1–0 2007 Championship play-off Final victory over West Brom. After this, it was found out that Barnes was playing with a broken foot and he missed all of the summer injured as Derby prepared for life back in the top flight. He was named Derby's Young Player of the Year for the 2006–07 season.

These injuries carried over into the start of Derby's disastrous 2007–08 season. He made his first Premier League appearance on 22 September 2007 as a substitute against Arsenal in the 75th minute and scored his first goal in a 2–2 draw against Newcastle United. The injuries that plagued Barnes through the course of his season, as well as no pre season and being put in the team two months earlier than was recommended, affected his form and he failed to play as vital a role in Derby's season as he had during 2006–07 and his season ended early when it was discovered he had a knee injury which required major surgery, meaning that he would miss the remainder of the 2007–08 season and the start of 2008–09.

Barnes returned to the Derby team in January 2009 and scored twice at Old Trafford in the League Cup semi-final second leg as Derby fell to a 4–2 defeat on the night, 4–3 on aggregate. After just three league appearances, on 31 January 2009, Barnes signed for Fulham on loan for the rest of the 2008–09 season with a view to a possible permanent transfer in the summer, with Derby receiving a substantial loan fee, and agreeing a fee of £2 million, raising to £4 million on appearances if he signed permanently. He did not make a single appearance for the Cottagers due to fitness, but scored seven in eight reserve matches. On 24 May, Roy Hodgson confirmed that Fulham would not be signing Barnes on a permanent basis and that he would return to Derby at the end of the season. Barnes returned to Derby but sustained another injury in a pre-season friendly against Stoke City after a two footed lunge by Carl Dickinson, and was eventually released from his Derby contract on 11 December 2009. After some weeks training with Premier League club Birmingham City, where his brother was playing at academy level, in mid-January 2010 Barnes moved on to train with West Bromwich Albion of the Championship.

West Bromwich Albion
On 3 February 2010, Barnes signed for West Bromwich Albion on an 18-month contract, with an option for a further one-year extension.
He made his debut in the 1–0 win against Sheffield Wednesday on 9 March 2010, coming off the bench for the last 10 minutes of the match. On 25 May 2011 it was announced that Barnes was being released by West Brom. He had not played any matches for the club since the arrival of manager Roy Hodgson in January 2011. After being released by WBA, Barnes was linked with a move to Nottingham Forest with Steve McClaren wanting to sign the player.

Doncaster Rovers
On 4 August 2011, Barnes signed a six-month contract with Doncaster Rovers following a successful trial at the club. Barnes made his debut for the club as a substitute in the first match of the 2011–12 season against Brighton & Hove Albion. Barnes made a mixture of starts and substitute appearances at Rovers. On 6 January, Barnes signed a four-month extension keeping at Doncaster until 5 May 2012. On 25 February 2012 Barnes scored his first goal for Doncaster Rovers in a 1–1 draw against Peterborough United. In May 2012, Barnes was released by the club after the expiry of his contract.

Houston Dynamo

Barnes signed with Major League Soccer club Houston Dynamo on 29 August 2012. He scored his first goal with the club in the CONCACAF Champions League against CD FAS of El Salvador on 20 September 2012. Barnes scored his first MLS league goal on 23 March 2013 in Houston's 2–1 victory over Vancouver Whitecaps FC. On 21 September 2013, Barnes scored his first MLS brace against Chivas USA in a 5–1 victory for the Houston Dynamo.

On 4 March 2016, Barnes was appointed captain of the Houston Dynamo for the 2016 season.

Vancouver Whitecaps FC 
Barnes was traded to Vancouver Whitecaps FC on 30 July 2016 in exchange for general allocation money and the MLS rights to Keyner Brown. The deal also dictated that Houston will receive a percentage of any future transfer fees if Barnes is loaned or transferred outside the league.

Orlando City SC 
Barnes was traded to fellow MLS club Orlando City SC on 25 February 2017 in exchange for Brek Shea. He made his first appearance for Orlando against New York City FC on 5 March 2017, coming on as a substitute in the 11th minute after Kaká suffered a hamstring injury. Barnes became a designated player after Orlando waived Bryan Róchez on 17 March 2017. At the end of the 2017 season, Orlando opted to decline their contract option on Barnes.

Leon
Barnes signed with Mexican club León on 9 January 2018.

Colorado Rapids
On 13 July 2018, Barnes signed a six-month deal with MLS side Colorado Rapids. He was released by Colorado at the end of their 2018 season.

Hyderabad FC
In 2019, he signed for ISL side Hyderabad FC.

International career
Barnes represented England at under-19 level in several friendly matches during 2006 and 2007. Barnes was also eligible to represent Jamaica internationally through his paternal grandparents and in March 2014, he announced his intention to represent Jamaica at senior international level. In February 2015, Barnes announced his FIFA paperwork had been submitted to play for Jamaica. He could be included in the squad as soon as late March.

Barnes was called up to Jamaica's squad for friendly matches against Venezuela and Cuba, scoring on his senior international debut against the former on 28 May 2015, the equaliser in a 2–1 win in Montego Bay. Later that day, he was included in Jamaica's 23-man squad for the 2015 Copa América held in Chile, and featured in all of their matches in a group-stage exit.

At the 2015 CONCACAF Gold Cup, Barnes scored his second international goal to defeat Haiti 1–0 at the quarter-final stage. He then went on to score the decisive goal in the 2–1 semi-final defeat of hosts the United States at the Georgia Dome, as Jamaica qualified for their first ever Gold Cup final, which they eventually lost to Mexico.

Coaching career
On 15 February 2023, it was announced Barnes had been appointed assistant head coach to Seb Hines at National Women's Soccer League club Orlando Pride. He had been brought in during the previous season while Hines had assumed the role on an interim basis.

Personal life
He is the older brother of the footballer Marcus Barnes. Barnes holds a U.S. green card which qualifies him as a domestic player for MLS roster purposes.

Career statistics

Club

International

International goals
As of match played 16 February 2017. Jamaica score listed first, score column indicates score after each Barnes goal.

Honours
Derby County
Football League Championship play-offs: 2006–07

Individual
Derby County Young Player of the Year: 2006–07
Football League Championship Player of the Month: March 2007
Houston Dynamo Team MVP: 2014
Houston Dynamo Players' Player of the Year: 2014
Budweiser Golden Boot and Ironman of the Year awards: 2013, 2014

References

External links

Giles Barnes profile at the Orlando City SC website
Giles Barnes profile at the Jamaica Football Federation website

1988 births
Living people
Footballers from Barking, London
English footballers
English expatriate footballers
England youth international footballers
Citizens of Jamaica through descent
Jamaican footballers
Jamaican expatriate footballers
Jamaica international footballers
Association football midfielders
Association football forwards
Derby County F.C. players
Fulham F.C. players
West Bromwich Albion F.C. players
Doncaster Rovers F.C. players
Houston Dynamo FC players
Vancouver Whitecaps FC players
Orlando City SC players
Club León footballers
Colorado Rapids players
English Football League players
Premier League players
Major League Soccer players
Designated Players (MLS)
2015 Copa América players
2015 CONCACAF Gold Cup players
Copa América Centenario players
Expatriate soccer players in Canada
Expatriate soccer players in the United States
Expatriate footballers in Mexico
English expatriate sportspeople in Canada
English expatriate sportspeople in the United States
Jamaican expatriate sportspeople in Canada
Jamaican expatriate sportspeople in the United States
Black British sportsmen
English sportspeople of Jamaican descent
Jamaican expatriate sportspeople in India
Indian Super League players
Hyderabad FC players
Orlando Pride non-playing staff